Daniel Earnest Wagner Jr. (August 1, 1922 – December 27, 1997) was an American professional basketball player. He played in the National Basketball Association (NBA) for the Sheboygan Red Skins during the 1949–50 NBA season. Wagner also played in the National Basketball League for the Flint Dow A.C.'s during the 1947–1948 season. He played college basketball for the Schreiner Mountaineers and the Texas Longhorns.

Career statistics

NBA
Source

Regular season

References

1922 births
1997 deaths
American men's basketball players
Basketball players from Oklahoma
Flint Dow A.C.'s players
Guards (basketball)
Junior college men's basketball players in the United States
People from Henryetta, Oklahoma
Schreiner University alumni
Sheboygan Red Skins players
Texas Longhorns men's basketball players